Nattfjäril is a Wizex studio album, released in April 1982. The album peaked at 21st position at the Swedish albums chart. The album is the band's final with Kikki Danielsson as vocalist.

Track listing

Side A

Side B

Contributors 
Electric bass – Mats Nilsson
Drums – Jerker Nilsson
Guitrar – Tommy Karlsson
Guitar, vocals – Thommy Stjernfeldt
Piano, synthesizer – Lars Hagelin
Producer – Lennart Sjöholm
Vocals – Kikki Danielsson

Charts

References 

1982 albums
Wizex albums